Just Be Free is a demo album released by Warlock Records featuring music recorded by American singer Christina Aguilera. After finishing her run on The All-New Mickey Mouse Club, a then fifteen-year-old Aguilera began recording the album with New Jersey-based producers Robert Allecca and Michael Brown. The pair gave Aguilera the opportunity to use a recording studio and presented her with demo music with the understanding that they could use the material for their own purpose, but also claiming they would not commercially release the recordings.

Musically, the album consisted of dance style tracks as well as ballads, and saw Aguilera performing Spanish-language songs. The record was conceived to showcase Aguilera's vocals in an effort to reach out to record labels, a venture which actually backfired after the recordings were not very well received among critics. Six years after the completion of the album and Aguilera had achieved mainstream success, Brown and Allecca released the record. Just Be Free has sold over 129,000 copies in the United States.

Background
After news that The New Mickey Mouse Club would be filming its final season, Aguilera sought out a record deal. She spent time in Philadelphia to record demo tracks with various producers, hoping to have an album released by the time she had finished high school. While taping the final season of the show, she began working with New Jersey based producers Roberts Allecca and Michael Brown. The pair eventually built a relationship with Aguilera and her family, offering her studio time. They told her that the demo recordings she would produce would be their property, but also that they would never commercially release the material. She recorded eleven "rough and unfinished" tracks which then went on to become the Just Be Free studio sessions.

Musical style

The early tapes were conceived as a way of introducing Aguilera to the music industry, described as a "foot in the door" attempt to build interest in her musical abilities. During the recording sessions, Aguilera experimented with different languages, recording songs such as the title track "Just Be Free" in Spanish. Although the rightful writers of the content have been disputed, the recording sessions have been described as influential on future recordings from Aguilera. Musically the album generally consisted of ballad material which was created in an effort to showcase Aguilera's vocal talents although in addition to the ballads recorded in these sessions, dance music became a prominent theme throughout the eleven tracks she recorded during this time.

Lawsuit and release
After discovery that Allecca and Brown would be releasing the album, Aguilera started developments to sue the pair in an effort to stop the release. Aguilera filed a suit against Warlock Records and the affiliates Platinum Recordings and JFB Music for "improper use of her name and license on the upcoming album Just Be Free". Carla Christofferson, her lawyer at the time, explained that "We're trying to stop them from releasing these early recordings which is not the quality she is associated with right now." However, Warlock Records president Adam Levy felt that despite Aguilera disliking the material, he found it to be a look into her life at the time of recording. He stated "It's a great look at what she was doing, We're pleased [to be putting the record out]. I'm more pleased for the album's producers who wanted to get it out. I hope the fans can appreciate it." Christofferson responded by alleging that Warlock Records tried to "boot strap" on Aguilera's success. In response to the lawsuit, Warlock Records filed their own lawsuit in an attempt to ensure the release of the record. During the proceedings, Aguilera agreed to let Warlock Records release Just Be Free after reaching a settlement with the company and its affiliates.  She allowed the release under the condition that the label would have to include a letter written by Aguilera in each album released. Since November 13, 2015, the album is available to stream on Spotify and Deezer.

Critical reception

The album received generally negative reviews from critics. Stephen Thomas Erlewine of AllMusic understood why Aguilera was dissatisfied with the release of the material, calling the songs "pre-professional" and "generic early-'90s dance-pop". He noted that Just Be Free did not match the quality of her self-titled debut album due to its "bland" production. David Browne of Entertainment Weekly gave the album a D-rating, citing the album's production and describing the content as "teen-jailbait" due to lyrics such as "Why don't you stay with me tonight".

Pier Dominguez, author of A Star Is Made, commented that the sessions demonstrated "Christina's raw vocal agility" despite calling the content "dull", adding "Christina's hunger for success actually comes through in these songs, as she sings her heart out with strained emotion, trying to sound as if she's letting all her inhibitions run free. If she did in fact co-write the songs then they were also a demonstration of Christina's songwriting dexterity, because the album's lyrics could be called unoriginal and perhaps even cheesy, it could not be said that they were not catchy". Similarly, Stephanie McGrath from JAM! Music also saw why Aguilera would not want the album released. Although she recognized Aguilera's potential as a vocalist, she wrote "The songs themselves are terrible, dated club tracks, overwhelmed by poor effects and mundane beats." Despite the negative critical reception, the album has sold over 129,000 copies in the United States and peaked at number 71 on the Billboard 200.

Track listing
All tracks are written by Bob Allecca, Michael Brown and Christina Aguilera, except where noted.

Personnel
Christina Aguilera – vocals, background vocals
Bob Allecca – executive producer
Michael Brown – executive producer
Amy Knong – art direction and design
Eliud "Liu" Ortiz – mixing engineer
Greg Smith – assistant mix engineer
Chris Gehringer – mastering engineer

Charts

References

Bibliography
 

2001 albums
Christina Aguilera albums
Compilation albums by American artists
Demo albums
Warlock Records albums